Miss Mujerzuela is the third album of the Venezuelan Latin Rock group Caramelos de Cianuro.

Members
 Asier Cazalís (Vocalist)
 Alfonso Tosta (Drummer)
 Luis Barrios (Bassist)
 Miguel González "El Enano" (Guitarist)

Track listing
 Asunto Sexual
 La Llama
 El Flaco
 Las Estrellas
 Veterana
 Enfermo
 Lava Blanca
 Verónica
 Misteriosa
 Is it tonight?
 Las Estrellas (acoustic)

Guest musicians

 Percussion: Mauricio Arcas (tracks 01, 03, 05, 06, 07)
 Keyboards: Oswaldo Rodríguez (tracks 01, 03, 05, 06, 07, 08, 09) and Manuel Dizquez (track 02)
 Sequences: Oswaldo Rodríguez (tracks 02,10) and Manuel Dizquez (track 11)
 Trumpet: José Luis Osuna (track 06)
 First Violin: Alejandro Serna (track 04)
 Second Violin: Eddie Cordero (track 04)
 Viola: Pedro Tosta (track 04)
 Cello: Arturo Serna (track 04)
 Background Vocals: Ana Valencia, María José Valencia (tracks 04, 11) and Mariana Valencia & Vanessa Rodríguez (track 04)

2000 albums
Caramelos de Cianuro albums